El Tren De Los Momentos: En Vivo Desde Buenos Aires is the third live album by the Spanish singer-songwriter Alejandro Sanz. It was recorded during the concert offered in front of 45,000 people in the River Plate Stadium on March 23, 2007. The album, released in digipack format, contains a CD with a selection of 10 tracks of the concert and a DVD of two hours.

Track listing

CD 
 En la Planta de Tus Pies – 5:23
 Quisiera Ser – 5:42
 Enséñame Tus Manos – 4:45
 La Peleita (René Pérez, Alejandro Sanz) – 8:45
 Corazón Partío – 6:57
 Donde Convergemos – 6:38
 Se lo Dices Tú – 3:50
 El Alma al Aire – 5:48
 No es lo Mismo – 7:30
 Te lo Agradezco, Pero No con Shakira desde Santiago de Compostela Bonus Track – 5:23

DVD 
 El Tren de los Momentos
 En la Planta de Tus Pies
 Quisiera Ser
 Enséñame Tus Manos
 A la Primera Persona
 La Peleita
 Cuando Nadie Me Ve
 Corazón Partío
 Donde Convergemos
 Regálame la Silla Donde Te Esperé
 Se lo Dices Tú
 Labana
 Medley (Mi Soledad y Yo, La Fuerza del Corazón, Amiga Mía, ¿Y, Si Fuera Ella?)
 El Alma al Aire
 Try To Save Your Song
 ¿Lo Ves?
 Te lo Agradezco, Pero No
 No es lo Mismo
 Te lo Agradezco, Pero No con Shakira desde Santiago de Compostela Bonus Track

Personnel 
 Luis Aquino – Trumpet
 Mike Ciro – Director, electric guitar
 Sarah Devine – Background vocals
 Fernando Díaz – Engineer, mixing
 Claudio Divella – Photography
 Luis Dulzaides – Percussion
 Juan Carlos "Diez Pianos" García – Technician
 Selan Lerner – Background vocals, keyboards
 Carlos Martin – Keyboards, percussion, trombone, trumpet
 Alfonso Pérez – Background vocals, electric guitar, keyboards
 Steve Rodríguez – Bass
 Alejandro Sanz – Vocals
 Nathaniel Townsley – Drums
 Javier Vercher – Flute, saxophone

References

Alejandro Sanz live albums
2007 live albums
2007 video albums
Live video albums
Live albums recorded in Buenos Aires